Sorghum is a genus of about 25 species of flowering plants in the grass family (Poaceae). Some of these species are grown as cereals for human consumption and some in pastures for animals. One species is grown for grain, while many others are used as fodder plants, either cultivated in warm climates worldwide or naturalized in pasture lands.

History 
Sorghum was domesticated from its wild ancestor more than 5,000 years ago in what is today Sudan. The newest evidence comes from an archaeological site near Kassala in eastern Sudan, dating from 3500 to 3000 BC, and is associated with the neolithic Butana Group culture. It was the staple food of the kingdom of Alodia.

Taxonomy 
Sorghum is in the grass family, Poaceae, in the subfamily Panicoideae, in the tribe Andropogoneae  the same as maize (Zea mayz), big bluestem (Andropogon gerardi), and sugarcane (Saccharum spp.).

Species 
Accepted species recorded include:

Genetics and genomics 
Agrobacterium transformation can be used on this genus. Che et al., 2018 provides such a transformation system with a good success rate.

Distribution and habitat 
Seventeen of the 25 species are native to Australia, with the range of some extending to Africa, Asia, Mesoamerica, and certain islands in the Indian- and Pacific- Oceans.

Production 

Nigeria accounts for 12% of world product and USA accounts 10%. While other major producing countries are Sudan, Mexico, Ethiopia, India, Argentina, China and Brazil.

Toxicity 
In the early stages of the plants' growth, some species of sorghum can contain levels of hydrogen cyanide, hordenine, and nitrates, which are lethal to grazing animals. Plants stressed by drought or heat can also contain toxic levels of cyanide and nitrates at later stages in growth.

Uses 
The grains are edible and nutritious. It can be eaten raw when young and milky, but has to be boiled when older.

One species, S. bicolor, native to Africa with many cultivated forms, is an important crop worldwide, used for food (in the form of grain or sorghum syrup), animal fodder, the production of alcoholic beverages, and biofuels. Sorghum's cultivation has been linked by archeological research back to ancient Sudan around 6,000 to 7,000 BP.

All sorghums contain phenolic acids, and most contain flavonoids. Sorghum grains are one of the highest food sources of the flavonoid proanthocyanidin. Total phenol content (in both phenolic acids and flavonoids) is correlated with antioxidant activity. Antioxidant activity is high in sorghums having dark pericarp and pigmented testa. The antioxidant activity of sorghum may explain the reduced incidence of certain cancers in populations consuming sorghum.

In India Sorghum (Jowar) is a daily food. Paratha and roti are made by Jowar flour.

Popped sorghum is popular as a snack in India. The popped sorghum is similar to popcorn, but the puffs are smaller. Like popcorn, popping sorghum is done by microwave, in a pot, or other similar ways.
It may also be used as a flavoring for clarified butter (ghee).

In China, sorghum flour is used in combination with wheat flour to make noodles and breads.

Most varieties are drought- and heat-tolerant, nitrogen-efficient, and are especially important in arid and semi-arid regions, where the grain is one of the staples for poor and rural people. These varieties form important components of forage in many tropical regions. S. bicolor is an important food crop in Africa, Central America, and South Asia, and is the fifth most important cereal crop grown in the world.

In Nigeria, the pulverized red leaf-sheaths of sorghum have been used as a dyestuff to dye leather. In Algeria it has been used not only to dye leather, but also to dye wool.

Role in global economy 
Global demand for sorghum increased dramatically between 2013 and 2015, when China began purchasing US sorghum crops to use as livestock feed as a substitute for domestically grown corn. China purchased around $1 billion worth of American sorghum per year until April 2018, when China imposed retaliatory duties on American sorghum as part of the trade war between the two countries.

References

Further reading

External links 

 "Sorghum and millets in human nutrition" FAO Report (1995)  
 Sorghum on US Grains Council Web Site

 
Cereals
Forages
Tropical agriculture
Poaceae genera
Andropogoneae
Plant dyes